Xiaochang County is a county of eastern Hubei province, People's Republic of China. It is under the administration of Xiaogan City.

Administrative divisions
Xiaochang County is divided into 8 towns, 4 townships and 3 other areas:
Huayuan, Fengshan, Zhouxiang, Xiaohe, Wangdian, Weidian, Baisha, Zougang

Townships:
Xiaowu Township, Jidian Township, Huaxi Township, Doushan Township

Other Areas:
Xiaochang County Economic Development Area, Shuangyin Lake Ecology & Culture Tourism & Vacation Area, Shuangfeng Mountain Tourism & Vacation Area

References

 
Counties of Hubei
Xiaogan